"This Is the Life" is a song by Scottish singer-songwriter Amy Macdonald from her 2007 debut album of the same name. It was released on 10 December 2007 in the United Kingdom and in 2008 in most European countries. It became Macdonald's most successful single to date, topping eight European singles charts and reaching the top 10 on nine other European music listings. Conversely, the song did not match the success of "Mr Rock & Roll" in the United Kingdom, stalling at number 28 on the UK Singles Chart. The music video consists of pictures of Macdonald and her friends' night out.

The song was used in a 2010 advert for the Fiat 500 shown across Europe. It was also used in a Norwegian advert in early 2011 and re-entered the country's official chart at number one. The track was released in the United States on a vinyl 45 rpm single (Decca UCGR-00199-1) with a unique picture sleeve, backed with "Let's Start a Band."

Chart performance
The song was first released in December 2007 in the United Kingdom but achieved only moderate success, peaking at number 28 on the UK Singles Chart and number 18 on the Scottish Singles Chart. Throughout 2008, it was released throughout most of Europe, reaching number one in Austria, Belgium, the Czech Republic, and the Netherlands. In Flanders and the Netherlands, "This Is the Life" was the highest-selling song of 2008. The single reached the top three in France, Germany, Hungary, Italy, Spain, Sweden, and Switzerland. In Spain, the song was certified double platinum, denoting sales of over 80,000 units, in 2009. In Norway, the song reached number 10 during its initial release, but in January 2011, it re-entered the chart at number one. "This Is the Life" was Macdonald's only song to chart in North America, peaking at number 19 on the US Billboard Adult Alternative Songs chart.

Track listings
UK and European CD single
 "This Is the Life"
 "This Much Is True"

French CD single
 "This Is the Life"

Charts

Weekly charts

Year-end charts

Decade-end charts

Certifications

Release history

References

2007 singles
2007 songs
Amy Macdonald songs
Dutch Top 40 number-one singles
Mercury Records singles
Number-one singles in Austria
Number-one singles in the Czech Republic
Number-one singles in Norway
Songs written by Amy Macdonald
Ultratop 50 Singles (Flanders) number-one singles
Ultratop 50 Singles (Wallonia) number-one singles
Vertigo Records singles